The Great Ouse Boating Association (GOBA) is a waterway society on the rivers Great Ouse, River Cam, Lark, Little Ouse, River Wissey, and associated waterways in East Anglia.

The voluntary association was founded in 1958, and has over 3000 members. GOBA is a member of the "Cambridgeshire Boatwatch Scheme", in cooperation with Cambridgeshire Police, the Environment Agency, and the Association of Nene River Clubs.

External links
National Archives, correspondence GOBA
Environment Agency as the Navigation Authority of the Great Ouse
GOBA News, newsletter of the Great Ouse Boating Association, with river map
Great Ouse Boating Association celebrates its Golden Jubilee in 2008
Great Ouse Boating Association website

See also
List of waterway societies in the United Kingdom

Waterways organisations in England
Clubs and societies in Norfolk
River Great Ouse